Tom Clancy's Ghost Recon: Shadow Wars is a turn-based tactics video game for the Nintendo 3DS  developed and published by Ubisoft in 2011. The game is part of the Ghost Recon series of the Tom Clancy games. First images of the game were leaked by IGN in 2010. The game was released on March 25, 2011 in Europe, March 22 in North America, and March 31 in Australia as a launch title for Nintendo's new console. It was later released in Japan on May 19, 2011. The game released in North America five days before the Nintendo 3DS North American launch.

Shadow Wars received generally positive reviews from critics, who praised its gameplay, design and combat, and called it an improvement over its recent predecessors, while criticizing its multiplayer and characters.

Gameplay
The battle system is similar to other turn-based tactics video games, such as Advance Wars and Fire Emblem, but elevation and cover play a critical tactical role and its support fire system makes the combat system distinctive. The battle system is similar to Gollop's previous video games Rebelstar: Tactical Command and UFO: Enemy Unknown.

Completing objectives in missions gives the player points which can be used to upgrade the rank of each unit. Units have a predetermined development tree, with each new level granting a mix of Hit Point (HP) bonuses, new abilities and alternative equipment. Players choose which points to spend on each unit.

The game can be played in three modes:
Campaign Game: The single player campaign has 37 missions for a total playing time of around 35–45 hours, depending on difficulty level selected. The player controls a team of up to six Ghosts through the story based campaign, leveling them up and upgrading their equipment as the story progressed.
Skirmish Missions: There are 20 skirmish missions which are standalone missions with fixed teams and deployments.
Multiplayer Missions: There are 10 multiplayer missions which are played using a single 3DS console.

The game features several playable characters:
Commando: The Commando (Duke) is equipped with an assault rifle and a hi-tech shoulder mounted missile launcher. The commando is effectively like human artillery, but very mobile. They come in two types: anti-vehicle or anti-personnel.
Sniper: The sniper (Haze) is a long range specialist. He has a choice between heavy sniper rifles, with good armor penetration, or light sniper rifles, which give better mobility. His secondary weapons include a choice of either AP or EMP grenades.
Gunner: The gunner (Richter) is equipped with a high-powered automatic weapon with excellent damage and return fire, but limited maneuverability. He has a choice of grenades for his secondary weapon.
Medic: The Medic (Saffron) has effective personal defense weapons and a choice of medi-kits, including a 'stim kit', which can allow characters to act again, or a 'boost kit', which provides power points.
Recon: The Recon (Banshee) is equipped with a special camouflage system that prevents any direct attacks against her unless she is revealed by an adjacent enemy. She is equipped with silenced carbines for a main weapon, and a choice of EMP grenades or knife for secondary weapon.
Engineer: The engineer (Mint) is equipped with an assault rifle as his main weapon. His secondary equipment is either a deployable gun turret or an armed, mobile drone. He can also repair vehicles and drones.

In addition to these there are other units which join the player's squad as part of the story and can be issued instructions during missions.

Reception

Reviews for the game were generally favorable. GameRankings gave it a score of 78.88%, while Metacritic gave it 77 out of 100. GameSpot scored the game 8 out of 10, but called the story one-dimensional. Official Nintendo Magazine praised the game's accessibility and gave it an 80%. Anthony Gallegos of IGN criticized the game's multiplayer component, repetitiveness of the campaign and clichéd characters but stated that the game was still fun enough for him to recommend to turn-based game fans, ending with scoring it a 7 out of 10.

References

External links 
 

2011 video games
Multiplayer and single-player video games
Nintendo 3DS games
Nintendo 3DS-only games
Tom Clancy games
Tom Clancy's Ghost Recon games
Turn-based tactics video games
Ubisoft games
Video games developed in Bulgaria
Video games set in Kazakhstan